"Cuttin' Capers" may refer to:

"Cuttin' Capers" (song), a popular tune written by Earl Burtnett, Gus Chandler, Bert White, and Henry Cohen in 1915
Cuttin' Capers (album), a 1959 Doris Day album